Wigoder is a surname. Notable people with the surname include:

Basil Wigoder (1921–2004), British politician and barrister
Charles Wigoder (born 1960), English telecommunications entrepreneur and philanthropist